The Razors Edge is the twelfth studio album by Australian hard rock band AC/DC released on 21 September 1990. It was a major comeback for the band, featuring the hits "Thunderstruck" and "Are You Ready", which reached #5 and #16 respectively on Billboard'''s Mainstream Rock Tracks Chart, and "Moneytalks", which peaked at #23 on the Billboard Hot 100. The album reached #2 on the US Billboard 200 and #4 in the UK, a smash commercial success that returned the band to the popularity of its glory years of the late 1970s and early 1980s. The album has been certified 5× platinum (5 million copies sold) in the US, and was re-released in 2003 as part of the AC/DC Remasters series. This is the only studio album to feature Chris Slade, who was the drummer for AC/DC from 1989 to his dismissal in 1994.

Background
The band had recorded Blow Up Your Video (1988) with their original producers, Harry Vanda and George Young. It was a commercial success and sold more copies than the previous two studio releases combined. The Blow Up Your Video World Tour began in February 1988 in Perth, Australia. That April, on the eve of the North American leg of the tour, Malcolm Young announced that he was taking time off from touring, principally to begin recovery from his alcoholism. Another member of the Young family, their nephew, Stevie Young, temporarily took Malcolm's place on rhythm guitar.  Following the tour, drummer Simon Wright left the group to work on the upcoming Dio album Lock Up the Wolves, and was replaced by ex-Firm and Manfred Mann's Earth Band drum veteran Chris Slade, whom Malcolm remembered playing with Manfred Mann during an appearance in Sydney years earlier with Deep Purple and Free.

Recording and compositionThe Razors Edge was recorded at Windmill Lane Studios in Dublin, Ireland and Little Mountain Sound Studios in Vancouver, BC, Canada, and was mixed and engineered by Mike Fraser and produced by Bruce Fairbairn, who had previously worked with Aerosmith and Bon Jovi.   According to the book AC/DC: Maximum Rock & Roll, George Young was involved early on but had to bow out because of personal issues.  Lead singer Brian Johnson was unavailable for several months while finalising his divorce, so the Young brothers wrote all the songs for the next album, a practice they continued for all subsequent releases (In a 1995 interview, Johnson told Guitar World that he was relieved at not having to deal with the pressure of writing the lyrics anymore). The instantly recognizable opening riff to "Thunderstruck" features Young alternating between fretted notes and playing the open string.  In a 1993 interview with Guitar World's Alan Di Perna, the guitarist recalls, "I was just fiddling with my left hand when I came up with that riff; I played it more by accident than anything.  I thought, 'not bad,' and put it on a tape.  That's how me and Malcolm generally work.  We put our ideas down on tape and play them for one another."  He expanded in greater detail in the liner notes of the 2003 re-release of The Razors Edge:

"It started off from a little trick I had on guitar. I played it to Mal and he said 'Oh, I've got a good rhythm idea that will sit well in the back.' We built the song up from that. We fiddled about with it for a few months before everything fell into place. Lyrically, it was really just a case of finding a good title...We came up with this thunder thing and it seemed to have a good ring to it. AC/DC = Power. That's the basic idea."

"Moneytalks" is also one of AC/DC's biggest hits, breaking the top 40 on the Billboard Hot 100, the UK Singles Charts, and the Australian ARIA Singles Chart. It is still the band's highest-charting single in the United States, at number 23 (no other AC/DC single has ever cracked the top 30). During their subsequent world tour, thousands of "Angus Bucks" were dropped on the audience during the song. A music video of the song, directed by David Mallet, was also released, featuring a live performance during the tour.  Author Murray Engleheart states in his band memoir AC/DC: Maximum Rock & Roll:  "On songs like 'Mistress for Christmas' and "Moneytalks,' Malcolm and Angus showed their working-class roots, despite multi-millionaire selling albums, by taking aim at the high flyers in the business world."  In a February 1991 interview with Guitar World Angus Young stated, "I think the funniest song on this album is 'Mistress For Christmas.' That song's about Donald Trump. He was big news at the time, so we thought we'd have a bit of fun and humor with it."  In the same interview, he declared that his best guitar solo on the LP was on the song "The Razors Edge," which also features a rare foray into finger picking.  Although AC/DC had always remained apolitical when it came to their music, the title track was a commentary of sorts, with Young explaining to Muchmusic in 1992:

"The Razors Edge" comes from an old saying farmers used to use in Britain where you'd have a fine sunny day, you know, a very good day with a hot sun, and then all of a sudden right in the distance you could see these black clouds coming over the horizon, an ominous thing...I thought it was a great title.  The world was at peace again and everyone thought, "Ah, the Berlin Wall's come down and it's all gonna be fun and games, a party every night," and you can see now that it's not that way.  It's just our way of saying the world's not perfect and never will be.

Tour

With the release of The Razors Edge, AC/DC undertook a world tour, possibly the most publicized tour they had ever done. The success of the tour was fueled by the crowd-pleasing songs, such as "Thunderstruck", "Moneytalks", "Fire Your Guns", "The Razor's Edge", and "Are You Ready", which were also included on the AC/DC Live Collector's Edition album as live versions.  Several shows on the Razors Edge Tour were recorded for the 1992 live album titled Live. Live was produced by Fairbairn, and is considered one of the best live albums of the 1990s.

Commercial performance and receptionThe Razors Edge peaked at No. 2 on the Billboard 200 charts and stayed on the chart for 77 consecutive weeks. It also reached No. 4 on the UK charts. The album helped return AC/DC to its former glory. Currently, the album has sold 5 million copies in the US, certifying it at 5× platinum. The album has sold approximately ten to twelve million copies worldwide, making it the fourth highest selling AC/DC album (after Dirty Deeds Done Dirt Cheap, Highway to Hell and Back in Black and ahead of Who Made Who).

The album received generally mixed to positive reviews. AllMusic complimented both the vocal performance by Brian Johnson and the guitar playing of Angus Young, and said that the album was "arguably [the band's] strongest album in over half a decade." Entertainment Weekly gave the album a very favourable review, saying that "this is one album that really delivers." Canadian journalist Martin Popoff defined the album "tight, highly strung and menacing... entirely worthy of its status as the grand comeback of legendary rock 'n' roll runts". Rolling Stone, on the other hand, gave the album two out of five stars, criticizing its similarity to past AC/DC works, and said that "with The Razors Edge, AC/DC sets a new record for the longest career without a single new idea." In a 2008 Rolling Stone'' cover story David Fricke wrote: "After a few albums that sounded like old ideas warmed over once too often, this is a near-comeback, busting out with Angus' wasp-army trills in the first song."

Track listing

Personnel
AC/DC
Brian Johnson – lead vocals
Angus Young – lead guitar
Malcolm Young – rhythm guitar, backing vocals
Cliff Williams – bass guitar, backing vocals
Chris Slade – drums, percussion

Production
Bruce Fairbairn – producer
Mike Fraser – engineer, mixing
 Brian Dobbs, Sean Leonard – assistant engineers
Ian Taylor, Ken Lomas – additional recordings
 George Marino at Sterling Sound, NYC – mastering
 Stewart Young – management

Charts

Weekly charts

Year-end charts

Certifications

References

External links
 Lyrics

1990 albums
AC/DC albums
Albert Productions albums
Atco Records albums
Atlantic Records albums
EMI Records albums
Albums produced by Bruce Fairbairn
Albums recorded at Little Mountain Sound Studios